The Essential is a compilation album by English singer Nik Kershaw, released in 2000. It features singles and album tracks from his first four studio albums: Human Racing (1984), The Riddle (1984), Radio Musicola (1986), and The Works (1989).

Track listing
All tracks written by Nik Kershaw.

External links 
 

Nik Kershaw albums
2000 compilation albums